Tironian notes are a set of thousands of signs that were formerly used in a system of shorthand (Tironian shorthand) dating from the 1st century BCE and named after Tiro, a personal secretary to Marcus Tullius Cicero, who is often credited as their inventor. Tiro's system consisted of about 4,000 signs, extended to 5,000 signs by others. During the medieval period, Tiro's notation system was taught in European monasteries and expanded to a total of about 13,000 signs. The use of Tironian notes declined after 1100 but lasted into the 17th century. A few Tironian signs are still used today.

Note on sign counts

Tironian notes can be themselves composites (ligatures) of simpler Tironian notes, the resulting compound being still shorter than the word it replaces. This accounts in part for the large number of attested Tironian notes, and for the wide variation in estimates of the total number of Tironian notes. Further, the "same" sign can have other variant forms, leading to the same issue.

History

Development
Before Tironian shorthand became popularized,  literature professor Anthony Di Renzo explains, "no true Latin shorthand existed." The only systematized form of abbreviation in Latin was used for legal notations. This system, however, was deliberately abstruse and accessible only to people with specialized knowledge. Otherwise, shorthand was improvised for note-taking or writing personal communications, and these notations would not have been understood outside of closed circles. Some abbreviations of Latin words and phrases were commonly recognized, such as those inscribed on monuments.

Scholars believe that Marcus Tullius Cicero (106–43 BC) recognized the need for a comprehensive, standard Latin notation system after learning about the intricacies of the Greek shorthand system and delegated the task of creating this new system to his slave and personal secretary Tiro. Tiro's position required him to quickly and accurately transcribe dictations from Cicero, such as speeches, professional and personal correspondence, and business transactions, sometimes while walking through the forum or during fast-paced and contentious government and legal proceedings. Nicknamed "the father of stenography" by historians, Tiro developed a highly refined and accurate method that used Latin letters and abstract symbols represented prepositions, truncated words, contractions, syllables, and inflections. According to Di Renzo: "Tiro then combined these mixed signs like notes in a score to record not just phrases, but, as Cicero marvels in a letter to Atticus, 'whole sentences.'" Tiro's highly refined and accurate method became the first standardized and widely adopted system of Latin shorthand. The system consisted of  abbreviations and abstract symbols, which were either contrived by Tiro or borrowed from Greek shorthand.

Controversy
Dio Cassius attributes the invention of shorthand to Maecenas, and states that he employed his freedman Aquila in teaching the system to numerous others. Isidore of Seville, however, details another version of the early history of the system, ascribing the invention of the art to Quintus Ennius, who he says invented 1100 marks. Isidore states that Tiro brought the practice to Rome, but only used Tironian notes for prepositions. According to Plutarch in "Life of Cato the Younger", Cicero's secretaries established the first examples of the art of Latin shorthand:

Introduction
There are no surviving copies of Tiro's original manual and code, so knowledge of it is based on biographical records and copies of Tironian tables from the medieval period. Historians typically date the invention of Tiro's system as 63 BC, when it was first used in official government business according to Plutarch in his biography of Cato the Younger in The Lives of the Noble Grecians and Romans. Before Tiro's system was institutionalized, he used it himself as he was developing and fine-tuning it, which historians suspect may have been as early as 75 BC, when Cicero held public office in Sicily and needed his notes and correspondences to be written in code to protect sensitive information he had gathered about corruption among other government officials there.

There is evidence that Tiro taught his system to Cicero and his other scribes, and possibly to his friends and family, before it was widely used. In "Life of Cato the Younger", Plutarch wrote that during Senate hearings in  relating to the first Catilinarian conspiracy, Tiro and Cicero's other secretaries were in the audience meticulously and rapidly transcribing Cicero's oration. On many of the oldest Tironian tables, lines from this speech were frequently used as examples, leading scholars to theorize it was originally transcribed using Tironian shorthand. Scholars also believe that in preparation for speeches, Tiro drafted outlines in shorthand that Cicero used as notes while speaking.

Expansion
Isidore tells of the development of additional Tironian notes by various hands, such as Vipsanius, Philargius, and Aquila (as above), until Seneca systematized the various marks to be approximately 5000 in number.

Use in the Middle Ages
Entering the Middle Ages, Tiro's shorthand was often used in combination with other abbreviations and the original symbols were expanded to 14,000 symbols during the Carolingian dynasty, but it quickly fell out of favor as shorthand became associated with witchcraft and magic and was forgotten until interest was rekindled by Thomas Becket, archbishop of Canterbury, in the 12th century. In the 15th century Johannes Trithemius, abbot of the Benedictine abbey of Sponheim in Germany, discovered the notae Benenses: a psalm and a Ciceronian lexicon written in Tironian shorthand.

In Old English manuscripts, the Tironian  served as both a phonetic and morphological place holder. For instance, a Tironian  between two words would be phonetically pronounced ond and would mean 'and'. However, if the Tironian  followed the letter s, then it would be phonetically pronounced sond and mean 'water' (ancestral to Modern English sound in the geographical sense). This additional function of a phonetic as well as a conjunction placeholder has escaped formal Modern English; for example, one may not spell the word sand as s& (although this occurs in an informal style practised on certain Internet forums and sometimes in texting and other forms of instant messaging). This practice was distinct from the occasional use of &c. for etc., where the & is interpreted as the Latin word  ('and') and the c. is an abbreviation for Latin  ('[the] rest').

Current

In blackletter texts (especially in German printing), it was still used in the abbreviation  =  (for ) throughout the 19th century.

Support on computers
The use of Tironian notes on modern computing devices is not always straightforward. The Tironian   is available at Unicode point U+204A, and can be made to display (e.g. for documents written in Irish or Scottish Gaelic) on a relatively wide range of devices: on Microsoft Windows, it can be shown in Segoe UI Symbol (a font that comes bundled with Windows Vista onwards); on macOS and iOS devices in all default system fonts; and on Windows, macOS, ChromeOS, and Linux in the free DejaVu Sans font (which comes bundled with ChromeOS and various Linux distributions).

Some applications and websites, such as the online edition of the Dictionary of the Irish Language, substitute the Tironian et with the box-drawing character U+2510 ┐, as it looks similar and displays widely. The numeral 7 is also used in informal contexts such as Internet forums and occasionally in print.

A number of other Tironian signs have been assigned to the Private Use Area of Unicode by the Medieval Unicode Font Initiative (MUFI), who also provide links to free typefaces that support their specifications.

Gallery

See also
 Ampersand
 Gaelic script
 Scribal abbreviation

References

External links

 Wilhelm Schmitz: Commentarii notarum tironianarum, 1893 (Latin)
Émile Chatelain: Introduction à la lecture des notes tironiennes, 1900 (French)
 Karl Eberhard Henke: Über Tironische Noten Manuscript B 16 of the Bibliothek der Monumenta Germaniae Historica, c. 1960 (German) (See 33. within for examples of composite Tironian notes.)
 Martin Hellmann: Supertextus Notarum Tironianarum Online dictionary of Tironian notes, based on Schmitz 1893 (German)

Shorthand systems
Latin language in ancient Rome
Typography
Latin-script letters
60s BC establishments
Writing systems introduced in the 1st century